Vlaho Kabužić (27 December 1698 – 1750), was a Ragusan nobleman and diplomat. He was a member of the influential Kabužić noble family. He is known for being poklisar harača (ambassador of kharaj), the man who brought the money from Dubrovnik to pay regular annual tribute to the Ottoman Sultan in Istanbul.

Family

Vlaho Kaboga was the son of Bernard Kaboga (*1671; †1753) and his wife Maria née Bosdari (*1671; †1753). He had several brothers and sisters, among which was Marin, the duke of Slano. In 1732 he married Katarina Gundulić (*1709; †1749), a daughter of Dživo Šiškov Gundulić and great-granddaughter of Ivan Gundulić, the most prominent ragusan Baroque poet.

He had a large family, of whom two sons, Bernard (*1739; †1814) and Ivan (*1743; †1826), were notable austrofils and freemasons, very influential Ragusan politicians who undertook many public duties. His grandsons Vlaho Filip "traditur" (*1774; †1854) and Bernard-Brno (*1785; †1855) were granted the title of count by the emperor of the Habsburg monarchy.

Vlaho's branch of the Kabužić family tree

See also

 Republic of Ragusa
 List of notable Ragusans
 Dubrovnik
 House of Kabužić
 History of Dalmatia

External links

 Vlaho, Bernard's son, a Ragusan poklisar (an ambassador of kharaj), in the Croatian Biographical Lexicon
 Poklisars, Ragusan diplomatic delegates to Ottoman Court, explained in the Encyclopedia of the Croatian Lexicographical Institute
 Vlaho Kabužić – diplomat from the Republic of Ragusa
 Vlaho Kabužić with his ancestors and descendants
 Vlaho's sons among the most prominent members of the Kabužić family

People from the Republic of Ragusa
18th-century Croatian people
Ragusan nobility
Ragusan diplomats
People from Dubrovnik
1698 births
1750 deaths
18th-century Croatian nobility